Pink Punch is the debut extended play by South Korean girl group Rocket Punch. The album was released digitally and physically on August 7, 2019 by Woollim Entertainment. The EP contains six tracks with the lead single "Bim Bam Bum".

Background and release
On July 22, 2019, Woollim Entertainment announced via SNS that Rocket Punch would debut.

Concept images featuring each of the members were released on July 31. The album contains six tracks including the lead single "Bim Bam Bum". The music video teaser was released on August 4 and the full music video on August 7.

Promotion
Rocket Punch held a live showcase at the Blue Square YES24 Live Hall on August 7, 2019, where they performed "Bim Bam Bum" along with "Lucid Dream" and "Love is Over".

The group started promoting the lead single "Bim Bam Bum" on August 8. They first performed the lead single on Mnet's M Countdown, followed by performances on KBS' Music Bank, MBC's Show! Music Core and SBS' Inkigayo. After ending promotions for "Bim Bam Bum", the group then continued promoting through the performances of the album's side track "Love Is Over" on music shows.

Track listing

Charts

Release history

References

2019 debut EPs
Korean-language EPs
Kakao M EPs
Woollim Entertainment EPs
Rocket Punch albums